Filipino entertainer Regine Velasquez has appeared in motion pictures and television programs. She made her screen debut with a minor role in the 1988 comedy film The Untouchable Family. She went on to appear in supporting roles in the comedies Pik Pak Boom (1988) and Elvis and James 2 (1990). Velasquez made her stage debut in 1992 with the Musical Theatre Philippines production of Romualdo Ramos and Tony Velasquezs Kenkoy Loves Rosing. Her breakthrough came when she played the title role in the film Wanted Perfect Mother (1996). The same year, she starred in the musical comedy Do Re Mi alongside Donna Cruz and Mikee Cojuangco. Among Velasquez's next releases were the fantasy comedy Honey Nasa Langit Na Ba Ako (1998) and Joyce Bernals romantic comedy Dahil May Isang Ikaw (1999) opposite Aga Muhlach. Her first leading television role was in a 2000 episode of the IBC-13 anthology series Habang May Buhay.

Velasquez's profile continued to grow in the 2000s as she took on starring roles in two lucrative romantic comedy films. She featured as a prominent singer desperate for a normal life in Kailangan Ko'y Ikaw (2000), and she re-teamed with Bernal and Muhlach in Pangako Ikaw Lang (2001)—Velasquez's biggest commercial success to date, for which she received the Box Office Entertainment Award for Box Office Queen. In 2002, she appeared in an episode of ABS-CBNs drama series, Maalaala Mo Kaya, playing an intellectually disabled woman who develops a romantic relationship with a younger man—a role that earned her the Star Award for Best Actress. That year, she also portrayed a mundane and undesirable mail sorter in the drama Ikaw Lamang Hanggang Ngayon, which garnered her a Young Critics Circle nomination for Best Actress. In 2003, Velasquez starred with Christopher de Leon in the romantic comedy Pangarap Ko Ang Ibigin Ka and played Darna in the superhero film Captain Barbell.

In 2004, Velasquez made her first prime time television appearance in the drama series Forever In My Heart. Two years later, she starred as a con woman in the romantic comedy Till I Met You with Robin Padilla. Her performance in the 2007 film Paano Kita Iibigin earned her nominations for Best Actress at the FAMAS and Luna Award. In 2008, she lent her voice to the eponymous character in the animated film Urduja, and returned to television in the comedy series Ako si Kim Sam Soon. She went on to play a facially disfigured aspiring singer in the musical series Diva (2010), and appeared opposite Dingdong Dantes in the comedy series I Heart You, Pare! (2011). In 2013, she won the Golden Screen Award for Best Actress for her performance as an identity document forger in the comedy Of All the Things. Three years later, she starred in the satirical comedy Mrs. Recto and the comedy series Poor Señorita.

Velasquez expanded her career into reality television talent shows, serving as a presenter on Star for a Night (2002), Pinoy Pop Superstar (2004), and The Clash (2018), and as a judge on StarStruck (2015) and Idol Philippines (2019). In addition, she had episode arc guest roles in the fantasy series Darna (2009) and Mulawin vs. Ravena (2017).

Film
{| class="wikitable sortable plainrowheaders"
|+ 
|- style="background:#ccc; text-align:center;"
!scope="col" | Year
!scope="col" | Title
!scope="col" | Role
!scope="col" class="unsortable" | Notes
!scope="col" class="unsortable" | 
|-
| style="text-align:center;" | 1988
! scope="row" | 
| 
|
|align=center|
|-
| style="text-align:center;" | 1988
! scope="row" | 
| 
|
|align=center|
|-
| style="text-align:center;" | 1990
! scope="row" | 
| align=center|
|
|align=center|
|-
| style="text-align:center;" | 1996
! scope="row" | 
| 
|
|align=center|
|-
| style="text-align:center;" | 1996
! scope="row" | 
| 
|
|align=center|
|-
| style="text-align:center;" | 1998
! scope="row" | 
| 
|
|align=center|
|-
| style="text-align:center;" | 1999
! scope="row" | 
| 
|
|align=center|
|-
| style="text-align:center;" | 2000
! scope="row" | 
| 
|
|align=center|
|-
| style="text-align:center;" | 2001
! scope="row" | 
| 
|
|align=center|
|-
| style="text-align:center;" | 2002
! scope="row" | 
| 
|
|align=center|
|-
| style="text-align:center;" | 2003
! scope="row" | 
| 
|
|align=center|
|-
| style="text-align:center;" | 2003
! scope="row" | 
| 
|
|align=center|
|-
| style="text-align:center;" | 2004
! scope="row" | 
| 
| Cameo
|align=center|
|-
| style="text-align:center;" | 2006
! scope="row" | 
| 
|
|align=center|
|-
| style="text-align:center;" | 2007
! scope="row" | 
| 
|
|align=center|
|-
| style="text-align:center;" | 2008
! scope="row" | 
|  (voice)
| Animated film
|align=center|
|-
| style="text-align:center;" | 2009
! scope="row" | 
| align=center|
| Cameo
|align=center|
|-
| style="text-align:center;" | 2009
! scope="row" | 
| align=center|
| Cameo
|align=center|
|-
| style="text-align:center;" | 2009
! scope="row" | 
| align=center|
| Cameo
|align=center|
|-
| style="text-align:center;" | 2012
! scope="row" | 
| 
|
|align=center|
|-
| style="text-align:center;" | 2016
! scope="row" | 
| 
|
|align=center|
|-
| style="text-align:center;" | 2019
! scope="row" | 
| 
| Cameo
|align=center|
|-
| style="text-align:center;" | 2019
! scope="row" | 
| 
|
|align=center|
|-
| style="text-align:center;" | 2019
! scope="row" | 
| 
| Cameo
|align=center|
|}

Television

{| class="wikitable sortable plainrowheaders"
|+ 
!scope="col" | Year
!scope="col" | Title
!scope="col" | Role
!scope="col" class="unsortable" | Notes
!scope="col" class="unsortable" | 
|-
| style="text-align:center;" | 1998
! scope="row" | 
| 
| Host
| align=center|
|-
| style="text-align:center;" | 2000
! scope="row" | 
| align=center|
| Episode: "Sa Puso Ko'y Ikaw"
| align=center|
|-
| style="text-align:center;" | 2001
! scope="row" | 
| align=center|
|
| align=center|
|-
| style="text-align:center;" | 2001
! scope="row" | 
| 
| Episode: "Lobo"
| align=center|
|-
| style="text-align:center;" | 2002
! scope="row" | 
| 
| Host
| align=center|
|-
| style="text-align:center;" | 2003
! scope="row" | 
| 
| Host
| align=center|
|-
| style="text-align:center;" | 2004
! scope="row" | 
| 
|
| align=center|
|-
| style="text-align:center;" | 2004
! scope="row" | 
| 
| Host
| align=center|
|-
| style="text-align:center;" | 2007
! scope="row" | 
| 
| Host
| align=center|
|-
| style="text-align:center;" | 2008
! scope="row" | 
| 
| Episode: "Dalandan (Great Love)"
| align=center|
|-
| style="text-align:center;" | 2008
! scope="row" | 
| 
| Television special
| align=center|
|-
| style="text-align:center;" | 2008
! scope="row" | 
| 
| Host
| align=center|
|-
| style="text-align:center;" | 2008
! scope="row" | 
| 
|
| align=center|
|-
| style="text-align:center;" | 2009
! scope="row" | 
| 
|
| align=center|
|-
| style="text-align:center;" | 2009
! scope="row" | 
| 
| Host
| align=center|
|-
| style="text-align:center;" | 2009
! scope="row" | 
| 
| Television special
| align=center|
|-
| style="text-align:center;" | 2009
! scope="row" | 
| 
| Episode: "The Eva Castillo Story"
| align=center|
|-
| style="text-align:center;" | 2009
! scope="row" | 
| 
| Season 2
| align=center|
|-
| style="text-align:center;" | 2009
! scope="row" | 
| 
| Television special
| align=center|
|-
| style="text-align:center;" | 2010
! scope="row" | 
| 
|
| align=center|
|-
| style="text-align:center;" | 2010
! scope="row" | 
| 
| Host
| align=center|
|-
| style="text-align:center;" | 2011
! scope="row" | 
| 
|
| align=center|
|-
| style="text-align:center;" | 2012
! scope="row" | 
| 
| Host
| align=center|
|-
| style="text-align:center;" | 2012
! scope="row" | 
| 
| Host
| align=center|
|-
| style="text-align:center;" | 2013
! scope="row" | 
| 
| Host
| align=center|
|-
| style="text-align:center;" | 2013
! scope="row" | Awit ng Pasko
| 
| Television special
| align=center|
|-
| style="text-align:center;" | 2014
! scope="row" | 
| 
| Host
| align=center|
|-
| style="text-align:center;" | 2014
! scope="row" | Himig ng Pasko
| align=center|
| Television special
| align=center|
|-
| style="text-align:center;" | 2016
! scope="row" | 
| 
|
| align=center|
|-
| style="text-align:center;" | 2017
! scope="row" | 
| 
| Host
| align=center|
|-
| style="text-align:center;" | 2017
! scope="row" | 
| 
|
| align=center|
|-
| style="text-align:center;" | 2018
! scope=row | 
| 
| Host
| align=center|
|-
| style="text-align:center;" | 2018
! scope=row | 
| 
| Host
| align=center|
|-
| style="text-align:center;" | 2019
! scope=row | 
| 
| Judge
| align=center|
|-
| style="text-align:center;" | 2020
! scope=row | 
| 
| 
| align=center|
|-
| style="text-align:center;" | 2022
! scope=row | 
| 
| Host
| align=center|
|-
| style="text-align:center;" | 2022
! scope=row | 
| 
| Judge
| align=center|
|-
| style="text-align:center;" | 2022
! scope=row | 
| 
| Guest judge
| align=center|
|}

Stage

Music videos

As a performer

Guest appearances

Video albums

Commercials

See also
 List of awards and nominations received by Regine Velasquez

Notes

References

External links
 
 [ Discography and videography of Regine Velasquez] at AllMusic

Actress filmographies
Videographies of Filipino artists
Screen
Philippine filmographies